Walbridge Abner Field (April 26, 1833 – July 15, 1899) was an American lawyer, jurist and politician who served as a member of the United States House of Representatives from Massachusetts, and as the chief justice of the Massachusetts Supreme Judicial Court.

Biography
He was born in North Springfield, Vermont on April 26, 1833.  He graduated from Dartmouth College in 1855, where he also served as a tutor. He studied law in Boston, Massachusetts and at the Harvard Law School.  Field was admitted to the bar in 1860 and commenced practice in Boston. He served as a member of the City's school committee, and represented wards 5 and 8 on Boston's Common Council.  

Field was appointed assistant United States Attorney in 1865, serving in this capacity until April 1869, when he was appointed Assistant Attorney General of the United States, holding this office until August 1870, when he resigned and resumed his law practice.

In 1876, Walbridge ran for a seat in Congress against Democrat Benjamin Dean. Initially the count showed that Dean was ahead by 44 votes. Dean's margin shrank to seven votes after a recount. A committee reviewing the election results found that 25 votes were cast for Field in the 4th District.  The Board of Canvassers determined that those were votes that were intended to be made for Field and the Boston Board of Aldermen voted to include those votes.  After the final count, Field was declared the winner by five votes.

Dean contested the election in the House of Representatives regarding the results of the election. Massachusetts Congressman Benjamin Butler, a Republican at the time, had a personal dislike of Field, according to news accounts of the time, and supported efforts to unseat Field in the House. The Committee on Elections held hearings on the matter and voted 6-5 to unseat Field and seat Dean instead. On March 27, 1878, the House voted 120-119 in favor of Dean with Republican Butler voting in the majority.  After initially supporting Field, Rep. James T. Jones of Alabama flipped his vote to Dean, saying that even though the facts supported Field, "that he had no right to have opinions of his own, and had surrendered them to the dictates of his colleagues."

In the 1878 elections, Field faced off with Dean in a rematch. The election included allegations from Butler that Field held anti-Irish views as he had once advertised for a servant in which he specified that he sought a Protestant and 'no Irish need apply". Field won the election by a larger majority; however, Dean again challenged the result charging irregularities with the count.  This time, Walbridge was seated and served out his term.  He declined to run for another term of office in 1880.

Field was appointed by Governor John Davis Long to the bench of the Massachusetts Supreme Judicial Court on February 21, 1881. He was promoted by Governor John Quincy Adams Brackett to the position of Chief Justice on September 4, 1890 and served until his death in Boston on July 15, 1899.  He was succeeded by Oliver Wendell Holmes. His interment was in Forest Hills Cemetery in West Roxbury.

References

External links

 

Massachusetts state court judges
Massachusetts lawyers
Burials in Massachusetts
Chief Justices of the Massachusetts Supreme Judicial Court
Harvard Law School alumni
Dartmouth College alumni
Boston School Committee members
1833 births
1899 deaths
Republican Party members of the United States House of Representatives from Massachusetts
19th-century American politicians
19th-century American judges
19th-century American lawyers